This is a list of mammals of Great Britain. The diversity of mammal fauna of Great Britain is somewhat impoverished compared to that of Continental Europe, due to the short period of time between the last ice age and the flooding of the land bridge between Great Britain and the rest of Europe. Only those land species which crossed before the creation of the English Channel and those introduced by humans exist in Great Britain.

Native (usually synonymous with "indigenous") species are considered to be species which are today present in the region in question, and have been continuously present in that region since a certain period of time. When applied to Great Britain, three possible definitions of this time constraint are:

 a species that colonised the islands during the glacial retreat at the end of the last ice age ( 9500 years ago);
 a species that was present when the English Channel was created (c. 8000 years ago); or,
 a species that was present in prehistory.

This list includes mammals from the small islands around Great Britain and the Channel Islands. There are no endemic mammal species in Great Britain, although four distinct subspecies of rodents have arisen on small islands.

The following tags are used to highlight the conservation status of each species' British population, as assessed by Natural England and The Mammal Society in a Regional Red List, following the criteria of the International Union for Conservation of Nature.

Diprotodonts
Order: Diprotodontia

Although marsupials are primarily found in the Australian region, the red-necked wallaby has been introduced to parts of Great Britain. Feral populations breed on the island of Inchconnachan on Loch Lomond in Argyll and Bute, Scotland, and on the Isle of Man. Other colonies have existed in Devon, the Peak District, and the Ashdown Forest in East Sussex, and although these are now believed to be locally extinct, occasional sightings continue.

Family: Macropodidae (kangaroos, wallabies, and kin)
 Red-necked wallaby, Notamacropus rufogriseus  introduced

Rodents 
Order: Rodentia

Rodents are the largest order of mammals, comprising 40% of all species. They are characterised by a single pair of continuously growing incisors in each of the upper and lower jaws and are native to almost all major landmasses on Earth.

Family: Castoridae (beavers)
 Eurasian beaver, Castor fiber  globally,  in Great Britain, reintroduced

Family: Cricetidae (hamsters, voles, and kin)
 European water vole, Arvicola amphibius  globally,  in Great Britain
 Short-tailed field vole, Microtus agrestis 
 Common vole, Microtus arvalis 
Orkney vole, M. a. orcadensis 
 Bank vole, Myodes glareolus 

Family: Muridae (mice, rats, and kin)

 Yellow-necked mouse, Apodemus flavicollis 
 Wood mouse, Apodemus sylvaticus 
St Kilda field mouse, A. s. hirtensis 
 Eurasian harvest mouse, Micromys minutus 
 House mouse, Mus musculus 
St Kilda house mouse, M. m. muralis (extinct c. 1930)
 Black rat, Rattus rattus  introduced
 Brown rat, Rattus norvegicus  introduced

Family: Gliridae (dormice)
 European edible dormouse, Glis glis  introduced
 Hazel dormouse, Muscardinus avellanarius  globally,  in Great Britain

Family: Sciuridae (squirrels)
 Eastern gray squirrel, Sciurus carolinensis  introduced
 Red squirrel, Sciurus vulgaris  globally,  in Great Britain

Lagomorphs 

Order: Lagomorpha

The lagomorphs comprise two families, Leporidae (hares and rabbits), and Ochotonidae (pikas). Although they can resemble rodents, and were classified as a superfamily in that order until the early 20th century, they have since been considered a separate order. They differ from rodents in a number of physical characteristics, such as having four incisors in the upper jaw rather than two.

Family: Leporidae (rabbits and hares)
 European hare, Lepus europaeus  introduced
 Mountain hare, Lepus timidus 
 European rabbit, Oryctolagus cuniculus  introduced

Eulipotyphlans 
Order: Eulipotyphla

The order Eulipotyphla contains insectivorous mammals. Hedgehogs are easily recognised by their spines, while gymnures look more like large rats. Shrews and solenodons closely resemble mice, while moles are stout-bodied burrowers.

Family: Talpidae (moles)
 European mole, Talpa europaea 

Family: Soricidae (shrews)
 Lesser white-toothed shrew, Crocidura suaveolens 
 Eurasian water shrew, Neomys fodiens 
 Common shrew, Sorex araneus 
 Eurasian pygmy shrew, Sorex minutus 

Family: Erinaceidae (hedgehogs and moonrats)
 European hedgehog, Erinaceus europaeus  globally,  in Great Britain

Bats 
Order: Chiroptera

Bats' most distinguishing feature is that their forelimbs are developed as wings, making them the only mammals capable of flight. Bat species account for about 20% of all mammals.

Family: Rhinolophidae (horseshoe bats)
 Lesser horseshoe bat, Rhinolophus hipposideros 
 Greater horseshoe bat, Rhinolophus ferrumequinum 

Family: Vespertilionidae (common bats, vesper bats, and kin)
 Western barbastelle, Barbastella barbastellus  globally,  in Great Britain
 Serotine bat, Eptesicus serotinus  globally,  in Great Britain
 Bechstein's bat, Myotis bechsteini 
 Brandt's bat, Myotis brandti 
 Daubenton's bat, Myotis daubentoni 
Greater mouse-eared bat, Myotis myotis  globally,  in Great Britain, possibly extirpated
 Whiskered bat, Myotis mystacinus 
 Natterer's bat, Myotis nattereri 
 Lesser noctule, Nyctalus leisleri 
 Common noctule, Nyctalus noctula 
 Nathusius pipistrelle, Pipistrellus nathusii 
 Common pipistrelle, Pipistrellus pipistrellus 
 Soprano pipistrelle, Pipistrellus pygmaeus 
 Brown long-eared bat, Plecotus auritus 
 Grey long-eared bat, Plecotus austriacus  globally,  in Great Britain
 Parti-coloured bat, Vespertilio murinus

Carnivorans  
Order: Carnivora

There are over 260 species of carnivorans, the majority of which feed primarily on meat. They have a characteristic skull shape and dentition.

Family: Canidae (dogs)
 Red fox, Vulpes vulpes 

Family: Mustelidae (weasels, badgers, and kin)
 Asian small-clawed otter, Aonyx cinereus  introduced
 Eurasian otter, Lutra lutra 
 European pine marten, Martes martes 
 European badger, Meles meles 
 Stoat, Mustela erminea ,
 Least weasel, Mustela nivalis 
 European polecat, Mustela putorius 
 American mink, Neogale vison  introduced

Family: Felidae (cats)
 European wildcat, Felis silvestris  globally,  in Great Britain
Scottish wildcat, F. s. silvestris 

Family: Phocidae (earless seals)
 Grey seal, Halichoerus grypus 
 Harbour seal, Phoca vitulina

Even-toed ungulates 
Order: Artiodactyla

The even-toed ungulates are ungulates whose weight is borne about equally by the third and fourth toes, rather than mostly or entirely by the third as in perissodactyls. There are about 220 artiodactyl species, including many that are of great economic importance to humans. Cetaceans are also considered to be even-toed ungulates for phylogenetic reasons.

Family: Suidae (pigs)
 Wild boar, Sus scrofa  reintroduced

Family: Cervidae (deer)
 Roe deer, Capreolus capreolus 
 Siberian roe deer, Capreolus pygargus , introduced, extirpated
 Red deer, Cervus elaphus 
Scottish red deer, C. e. scoticus
 Sika deer, Cervus nippon  introduced
 European fallow deer, Dama dama  introduced
 Water deer, Hydropotes inermis  introduced
 Reeves's muntjac, Muntiacus reevesi  introduced
Family: Bovidae (cattle, bison, and kin)

 European bison, Bison bonasus  reintroduced

Whales and dolphins
Order: Cetacea

The order Cetacea includes whales, dolphins and porpoises. They are the mammals most fully adapted to aquatic life: they have a spindle-shaped, nearly hairless body, protected by a thick layer of blubber, and forelimbs and tail modified to provide propulsion underwater.
Family: Balaenidae (right whales and bowhead whales)
 North Atlantic right whale, Eubalaena glacialis  globally, possibly extant in Great Britain
Family: Balaenopteridae (rorquals)
 Common minke whale, Balaenoptera acutorostrata 
 Sei whale, Balaenoptera borealis 
 Blue whale, Balaenoptera musculus 
 Fin whale, Balaenoptera physalus 

 Humpback whale, Megaptera novaeangliae 

Family: Phocoenidae (porpoises)

 Harbour porpoise, Phocoena phocoena  globally,  in Europe

Family: Physeteridae (sperm whales)
 Sperm whale, Physeter macrocephalus 
Family: Kogiidae (pygmy and dwarf sperm whales)

 Pygmy sperm whale, K. breviceps 

Family: Ziphiidae (beaked whales)
 Cuvier's beaked whale, Ziphius cavirostris 

 Northern bottlenose whale, Hyperoodon ampullatus 

 Sowerby's beaked whale, Mesoplodon bidens 
 Gervais' beaked whale, Mesoplodon europaeus 
 True's beaked whale, Mesoplodon mirus 
Family: Delphinidae (oceanic dolphins)
 White-beaked dolphin, Lagenorhynchus albirostris 
 Atlantic white-sided dolphin, Lagenorhynchus acutus 

 False killer whale, Pseudorca crassidens 
 Common dolphin, Delphinus delphis 

 Common bottlenose dolphin, Tursiops truncatus 

 Striped dolphin, Stenella coeruleoalba 
 Risso's dolphin, Grampus griseus 
 Orca, Orcinus orca

Locally extinct 

 Eurasian elk, Alces alces
 Grey wolf, Canis lupus
 Wolverine, Gulo gulo
 Eurasian lynx, Lynx lynx
 Reindeer, Rangifer tarandus
 Brown bear, Ursus arctos

See also
Biota of the Isle of Man
List of endemic species of the British Isles
List of extinct animals of the British Isles
List of mammals of Ireland

References

External links 

Mammals
Great Britain
Mammals
Mammals